Wizard's Challenge II is an adventure module for the 2nd edition of the Advanced Dungeons & Dragons fantasy role-playing game.

Plot summary
In Wizard's Challenge II, Baron Tigus Felmoor, regent of the frontier town of New Haven, summons a freelance mage to investigate "a ghastly creature that breathed fire ... whose hide was so tough that swords shattered when they struck it."

Publication history
Wizard's Challenge II was written by Kevin Melka, and published by TSR, Inc.

It was part of the One-On-One volumes, a series of single-player adventures, which also includes Fighter's Challenge by John Terra and Cleric's Challenge by L. Richard Baker III.

Reception
Rick Swan reviewed Wizard's Challenge II for Dragon magazine #215 (March 1995). He called Wizard's Challenge II "a breezy, undemanding AD&D game adventure for a Dungeon Master and a single PC". He notes that because the adventure is playable in a single session, "it's good practice for novices and a pleasant diversion for veterans". Swan felt that the One-On-One series, which also includes "the equally appealing" Fighter's Challenge and Cleric's Challenge "seems like a natural to me; I'm surprised other publishers haven't jumped on the bandwagon."

References

Dungeons & Dragons modules
Role-playing game supplements introduced in 1995